Kuray is a rural locality (a selo) and the administrative centre of Kurayskoye Rural Settlement of Kosh-Agachsky District, the Altai Republic, Russia. The population was 427 as of 2016. There are 6 streets.

Geography 
Kuray is located 66 km northwest of Kosh-Agach (the district's administrative centre) by road. Kyzyl-Tash is the nearest rural locality.

References 

Rural localities in Kosh-Agachsky District